The Gezhen Dam is a multi-purpose dam on the Changhua River in Hainan Province, China. The dam serves mainly to provide run-of-the-river hydroelectric power and to supply water for irrigation. Construction began in 2007, the reservoir began to fill in 2009 and the project was complete in December 2009.

See also

Daguangba Dam — located upstream
List of major power stations in Hainan
List of dams and reservoirs in China

References

Dams in China
Hydroelectric power stations in Hainan
Dams completed in 2009